Eduardo Retat (born 16 June 1948) is a Colombian former footballer. He played in ten matches for the Colombia national football team from 1975 to 1977. He was also part of Colombia's squad for the 1975 Copa América tournament.

References

External links
 
 

1948 births
Living people
Colombian footballers
Colombia international footballers
Place of birth missing (living people)
Association football forwards
Independiente Santa Fe footballers
Cúcuta Deportivo footballers
Atlético Nacional footballers
Colombian football managers
Deportivo Cali managers
Patriotas Boyacá managers
Unión Magdalena managers
Millonarios F.C. managers
Deportes Quindío managers
Deportivo Pereira managers
Real Cartagena managers
Cúcuta Deportivo managers
Atlético Bucaramanga managers